Sunset Harbor is an unincorporated community on the banks of the Lockwood Folly River and the Atlantic Intracoastal Waterway in Brunswick County, North Carolina, United States. It is bordered by the city limits of Oak Island and is situated across the river from Varnamtown. By road, the community can only be accessed by Sunset Harbor Road, which feeds into North Carolina Highway 211.

Unincorporated communities in North Carolina
Unincorporated communities in Brunswick County, North Carolina
Populated coastal places in North Carolina